Niveitalea is a Gram-negative, and strictly aerobic genus of bacteria from the family of Chitinophagaceae with one known species (Niveitalea solisilvae). Niveitalea solisilvae has been isolated from forest soil from the Jeju island in Korea.

References

Chitinophagia
Bacteria genera
Monotypic bacteria genera
Taxa described in 2017